A design is a plan or specification for the construction of an object or system or for the implementation of an activity or process or the result of that plan or specification in the form of a prototype, product, or process. The verb to design expresses the process of developing a design. In some cases, the direct construction of an object without an explicit prior plan (such as in craftwork, some engineering, coding, and graphic design) may also be considered to be a design activity. The design usually has to satisfy certain goals and constraints; may take into account aesthetic, functional, economic, or socio-political considerations; and is expected to interact with a certain environment. Typical examples of designs include architectural and engineering drawings, circuit diagrams, sewing patterns and less tangible artefacts such as business process models.

Designing
People who produce designs are called designers. The term 'designer' generally refers to someone who works professionally in one of the various design areas. Within the professions, the word 'designer' is generally qualified by the area of practice (so one may be, for example, a fashion designer, a product designer, a web designer, or an interior designer), but it can also designate others such as architects and engineers (see below: Types of designing). A designer's sequence of activities to produce a design is called a design process, using design thinking and possibly design methods. The process of creating a design can be brief (a quick sketch) or lengthy and complicated, involving considerable research, negotiation, reflection, modeling, interactive adjustment, and re-design.

Designing is also a widespread activity outside of the professions, done by more people than just those formally recognised as designers. In his influential book The Sciences of the Artificial the interdisciplinary scientist Herbert A. Simon proposed that "Everyone designs who devises courses of action aimed at changing existing situations into preferred ones". And according to the design researcher Nigel Cross "Everyone can – and does – design", and "Design ability is something that everyone has, to some extent, because it is embedded in our brains as a natural cognitive function".

History of design

Study of the history of design is complicated by varying interpretations of what constitutes ‘designing’. Many design historians, such as John Heskett, start with the Industrial Revolution and the development of mass production. Others subscribe to conceptions of design that include pre-industrial objects and artefacts, beginning their narratives of design in prehistorical times. Originally situated within art history, the historical development of the discipline of design history coalesced in the 1970s, as interested academics worked to recognize design as a separate and legitimate target for historical research. Early influential design historians include German-British art historian Nikolaus Pevsner and Swiss historian and architecture critic Sigfried Giedion.

Design education
Institutions for design education date back to the nineteenth century. The Norwegian National Academy of Craft and Art Industry was founded in 1818, followed by the United Kingdom's Government School of Design (1837), Konstfack in Sweden (1844), and Rhode Island School of Design in the United States (1877). The German art and design school Bauhaus, founded in 1919, greatly influenced modern design education.

Design education covers the teaching of theory, knowledge and values in the design of products, services and environments, and focusses on the development of both particular and general skills for designing. It is primarily orientated to preparing students for professional design practice, and based around project work and studio or atelier teaching methods.

There are also broader forms of higher education in design studies and design thinking, and design also features as a part of general education, for example within Design and Technology. The development of design in general education in the 1970s led to a need to identify fundamental aspects of ‘designerly’ ways of knowing, thinking and acting, and hence to the establishment of design as a distinct discipline of study.

Design process
Substantial disagreement exists concerning how designers in many fields, whether amateur or professional, alone or in teams, produce designs. Design researchers Dorst and Dijkhuis acknowledge that "there are many ways of describing design processes", and compare and contrast two dominant but different views of the design process: as a rational problem solving process and as a process of reflection-in-action. They suggested that these two paradigms "represent two fundamentally different ways of looking at the world positivism and constructionism". The paradigms may reflect differing views of how designing should be done and how it actually is done, and they both have a variety of names. The problem-solving view has been called "the rational model", "technical rationality" and "the reason-centric perspective". The alternative view has been called "reflection-in-action", "co-evolution", and "the action-centric perspective".

Rational model
The rational model was independently developed by Herbert A. Simon, an American scientist, and two German engineering design theorists, Gerhard Pahl and Wolfgang Beitz. It posits that:
 Designers attempt to optimize a design candidate for known constraints and objectives.
 The design process is plan-driven.
 The design process is understood in terms of a discrete sequence of stages.

The rational model is based on a rationalist philosophy and underlies the waterfall model, systems development life cycle, and much of the engineering design literature. According to the rationalist philosophy, design is informed by research and knowledge in a predictable and controlled manner.

Typical stages consistent with the rational model include the following:

 Pre-production design
Design brief – initial statement of intended outcome.
Analysis – analysis of design goals.
Research – investigating similar design solutions in the field or related topics.
Specification – specifying requirements of a design solution for a product (product design specification) or service.
Problem solving – conceptualizing and documenting design solutions.
Presentation – presenting design solutions.
 Design during production.
Development – continuation and improvement of a designed solution.
 Product testing – in situ testing of a designed solution.
 Post-production design feedback for future designs.
Implementation – introducing the designed solution into the environment.
Evaluation and conclusion – summary of process and results, including constructive criticism and suggestions for future improvements.
 Redesign – any or all stages in the design process repeated (with corrections made) at any time before, during, or after production.

Each stage has many associated best practices.

Criticism of the rational model
The rational model has been widely criticized on two primary grounds:

 Designers do not work this way – extensive empirical evidence has demonstrated that designers do not act as the rational model suggests.
 Unrealistic assumptions – goals are often unknown when a design project begins, and the requirements and constraints continue to change.

Action-centric model
The action-centric perspective is a label given to a collection of interrelated concepts, which are antithetical to the rational model. It posits that:

 Designers use creativity and emotion to generate design candidates.
 The design process is improvised.
 No universal sequence of stages is apparent – analysis, design and implementation are contemporary and inextricably linked.

The action-centric perspective is based on an empiricist philosophy and broadly consistent with the agile approach and methodical development. Substantial empirical evidence supports the veracity of this perspective in describing the actions of real designers. Like the rational model, the action-centric model sees design as informed by research and knowledge.

At least two views of design activity are consistent with the action-centric perspective. Both involve these three basic activities:

 In the reflection-in-action paradigm, designers alternate between "framing", "making moves", and "evaluating moves". "Framing" refers to conceptualizing the problem, i.e., defining goals and objectives. A "move" is a tentative design decision. The evaluation process may lead to further moves in the design.
 In the sensemaking–coevolution–implementation framework, designers alternate between its three titular activities. Sensemaking includes both framing and evaluating moves. Implementation is the process of constructing the design object. Coevolution is "the process where the design agent simultaneously refines its mental picture of the design object based on its mental picture of the context, and vice versa".

The concept of the design cycle is understood as a circular time structure, which may start with the thinking of an idea, then expressing it by the use of visual or verbal means of communication (design tools), the sharing and perceiving of the expressed idea, and finally starting a new cycle with the critical rethinking of the perceived idea. Anderson points out that this concept emphasizes the importance of the means of expression, which at the same time are means of perception of any design ideas.

Philosophies 
Philosophy of design is the study of definitions of design, and the assumptions, foundations, and implications of design. There are also many informal 'philosophies' for guiding design such as personal values or preferred approaches.

Approaches to design
Some of these values and approaches include:
 Critical design uses designed artifacts as an embodied critique or commentary on existing values, morals, and practices in a culture.
 Ecological design is a design approach that prioritizes the consideration of the environmental impacts of a product or service, over its whole lifecycle.
 Participatory design (originally co-operative design, now often co-design) is the practice of collective creativity to design, attempting to actively involve all stakeholders (e.g. employees, partners, customers, citizens, end-users) in the design process to help ensure the result meets their needs and is usable.
 Scientific design refers to industrialised design based on scientific knowledge. Science can be used to study the effects and need for a potential or existing product in general and to design products that are based on scientific knowledge. For instance, a scientific design of face masks for COVID-19 mitigation may be based on investigations of filtration performance, mitigation performance, thermal comfort, biodegradability and flow resistance.
 Service design designing or organizing the experience around a product and the service associated with a product's use.
 Sociotechnical system design, a philosophy and tools for participative designing of work arrangements and supporting processes – for organizational purpose, quality, safety, economics, and customer requirements in core work processes, the quality of peoples experience at work, and the needs of society.
 Transgenerational design, the practice of making products and environments compatible with those physical and sensory impairments associated with human aging and which limit major activities of daily living.
 User-centered design, which focuses on the needs, wants, and limitations of the end-user of the designed artifact. One aspect of user-centered design is ergonomics.

Relationship with the arts 
The boundaries between art and design are blurry, largely due to a range of applications both for the term 'art' and the term 'design'. Applied arts can include industrial design, graphic design, fashion design, and the decorative arts which traditionally includes craft objects. In graphic arts (2D image making that ranges from photography to illustration), the distinction is often made between fine art and commercial art, based on the context within which the work is produced and how it is traded.

Types of designing

See also

References

Further reading
Raizman, David Seth (12 November 2003). The History of Modern Design. Pearson. .

Design
Design studies
Aesthetics
Structure
Human activities
Engineering disciplines